The North Branch Rancocas Creek is a  tributary of Rancocas Creek in southwestern New Jersey in the United States.

The creek starts in the Pine Barrens of Brendan T. Byrne State Forest and Fort Dix Military Reservation, near Browns Mills.

From its confluence with Rancocas Creek, tidewater extends upstream to the upper end of Mount Holly.

The North Branch Rancocas Creek drains an area of 167 square miles. The creek is among the more developed portions of the Rancocas Creek watershed.

Tributaries
Greenwood Branch
Mount Misery Brook
Powells Run
Budd Run

See also
List of rivers of New Jersey
Rancocas Creek
South Branch Rancocas Creek
Southwest Branch Rancocas Creek

References

External links
U.S. Geological Survey: NJ stream gaging stations

Rivers in the Pine Barrens (New Jersey)
Rivers of New Jersey
Tributaries of Rancocas Creek
Rivers of Burlington County, New Jersey